Uncharacterized protein KIAA1109 is a protein that in humans is encoded by the KIAA1109 gene.

This protein has a function that is not yet understood.  KIAA1109 has 3 aliases, FSA (fragile site-associated) protein, MGC110967 and DKFZp781P0474.

Gene

Location 
KIAA1109 is found on the long arm of chromosome 4 (4q27), with the genomic sequence starting at 118,818,167 bp and ending at 119,010,362 bp

Gene Neighborhood 
The gene neighborhood of KIAA1109 involves 4 other genes.
KIAA1109 is a part of the KIAA1109/Tenr/IL2/IL21 gene region. This region consists of the three genes to the right of KIAA1109; ADAD1, IL2 and IL21. 
Another gene located in the neighborhood of KIAA1109 is TRPC3. This gene is to the left of KIAA1109 on the opposite side of the genes described above.

Expression 
According to data on NCBI’s EST Abundance Profile page for KIAA1109, the gene is expressed in many different tissues in humans. Human expression is seen most predominately in parathyroid, muscle, ear, eye, mammary gland, lymph node, thymus in addition to 27 other tissues.   KIAA1109 is also expressed in various disease states including 12 different tumors as well as bladder carcinoma, chondrosarcoma, glioma, leukemia, lymphoma, non-neoplasia, retinoblastoma tissues.  KIAA1109 is expressed in all stages of development from embryoid body to adult, except in infants. No expression of my gene is seen during the infant stage of development.

Promoter 
According to Genomatix’s ElDorado program the promoter region of KIAA1109 is predicted to be 601 base pairs in length. The promoter region starts 500 base pairs upstream of the 5’ UTR of KIAA1109 mRNA transcript and contains part of this 5’ UTR.

Homology 
KIAA1109 is conserved throughout many species. Orthologs have been found in many mammals and other vertebrates. More distant homologs have been identified in animals such as insects. See the mRNA and protein conservation sections below for more details.  No human paralogs for KIAA1109 have been identified.

mRNA

Splice Variants 
KIAA1109 has 13 mRNA splice variants and 6 unspliced variants. Variant A is the longest and most commonly occurring variant of the gene and is the subject of this article. KIAA1109 variant A is made up of 84 exons and is 15,592 base pairs in length. The accession number for this nucleotide is NM_015312.3.

Conservation 
The mRNA sequence of KIAA1109 is highly conserved throughout mammals. The mRNA sequence identity to mammals is no less than 81.9% (in platypus) and ranging up to 99.5% (in chimpanzees).   Birds also show fairly high conservation with mRNA sequence identities around 78% in zebra finches.
The table blow shows information on the mRNA orthologs.

Protein

General Properties 
KIAA1109 protein is 5005 amino acids in length,  and has a predicted molecular weight of 555519.38 daltons.   The isoelectirc point of KIAA1109 protein is predicted to be 6.12.

Composition 
The amino acid composition of KIAA1109 protein showed amino acid frequencies within 1.5% of that of normal human proteins for all but Alanine, Serine and Threonine. Alanine has a lower frequency in KIAA1109 than in that of a normal human protein while Serine and Threonine both have a higher frequency in KIAA1109 than in the average human protein.

Conservation 
The amino acid sequence of KIAA1109 is highly conserved throughout mammals. The protein identity ranges from 93.2% in Opossum to 99.8% in Chimpanzees and protein similarity is no less than 97% in all mammals included. Birds continue to show fairly high conservation with protein identities around 90% and proteins similarities at a high 96%. While conservation is still high the lower numbers may be due to small truncations on either, the 5’ and 3’ ends of these sequences.

As we move to the more distant species of zebra fish and then the red four beetle and carpenter ant the conservations drops. In the insects the protein identities are down to around 34%.

Conserved Domains 
NCBI conserved domains search identified two domains in KIAA1109. The first is the fragile site associated C-terminus, which is said to be linked to celiac disease susceptibility according to genome-wide-association studies and may also be associated with polycystic kidney disease.   The second conserved region identified by NCBI in KIAA1109 is an uncharacterized conserved protein (DUF2246), whose function is unknown and is conserved in various species from humans to worms.

Post Translation Modifications 
KIAA1109 is predicted to undergo various types of post translational modifications including glycate, N-glycosylation, O-GlcNAc, O Glycosylation, Sulfonation and Phosphorylation.

Subcellular Localization 
KIAA1109 contains one transmembrane domain from amino acids 26-46. 
No signal peptides, mitochondrial targeting sequences or chloroplast peptides were predicted for my protein and it is therefore not predicted to localize to secretory pathway, mitochondria or chloroplast.

Interacting Proteins 
MADH2 and Beta-catenin were both found to have a physical interaction with my protein as detached by display technonloy by Miyamoto-Sato et al. 2010.

References

Further reading

Uncharacterized proteins